Seo Yu-ri (born February 8, 1985) is a South Korean daewon broadcasting voice actress, actress, cosplayer and VJ. She is well known for a cast member on the TV show Saturday Night Live Korea, My Little Television, Code: Secret Room and Sweet Revenge 2.

References

External links

 
 

1985 births
Living people
South Korean film actresses
South Korean television actresses
South Korean voice actresses
South Korean television personalities
VJs (media personalities)
Cosplayers
People from Daegu